Paadum Vaanampadi is a 1985 Indian Tamil-language dance film released in 1985 produced by K. R. Cine Arts starring newcomer Anand Babu, Jeevitha and Nagesh. The film was the Tamil remake of the Hindi film Disco Dancer. It was a blockbuster hit and ran for more than one hundred days at Chennai and other centres. The Director of the film M. Jayakumar was flooded with many film offers from big production companies. Music was by Bappi Lahiri and Shankar–Ganesh.

Plot 

Even as a young child, Anand is the sole provider for his family consisting of his widowed mother and younger sister, Viji. His older brother Raja ran away from home unable to bear the humiliation after their father was falsely accused of theft and sent to jail by his boss Dharmalingam (Senthamarai). Anand is a street performer that sings with his mentor, Muthu (Nagesh). He befriends Radha, Dharmalingam's daughter, during a performance. Upset over the friendship, Dharmalingam  has Anand's mother arrested on a false charge. The impoverished family leaves the city in disgrace.

Years later, Dharmalingam's son Shyam (Ravi) is a famous disco dancer that's let his fame go to his head. He clashes with his manager Raja (Rajeev) and fires him. Raja is determined to find another dancer to unseat Shyam. He sees Anand (Anand Babu) dancing in the street and quickly raises him to be more popular than Shyam. Raja also discovers that Anand is his younger brother and the fractured family is reunited. Anand also reunites with Radha and the two fall in love. An increasingly frustrated Shyam sets out to woo Viji (Nithya) in an attempt to get revenge on Raja and Anand. Dharmalingam is also out for revenge after his ill-dealing of the family is made public. Dharmalingam and Shyam create chaos the siblings must deal with to succeed.

Cast 
Anand Babu as Anand
Jeevitha as Radha
Rajeev as Raja
Nithya as Viji
Senthamarai as Dharmalingam
Nizhalgal Ravi as Shyam
Manimala as Raja, Anand and Viji's mother
Janagaraj as Mani aka Mr. Bell
Vennira Aadai Moorthy as Saguni
Nagesh as Muthu (Guest Role)
Delhi Ganesh as Raja, Anand and Viji's father (Guest Role)

Soundtrack 
Soundtrack was composed by Bappi Lahiri and Shankar–Ganesh. The highlight of the album is the disco song "Naanoru Disco Dancer". "Aatathil Naanthaan Raja Raja" is a cover of "Video Killed the Radio Star".

Reception 
Kalki criticised the film for having too many stunt sequences, but said the scene where a monkey trains Anand Babu in stunts was first class.

References

External links 
 

1980s dance films
1980s musical drama films
1980s Tamil-language films
1985 drama films
1985 films
Films scored by Bappi Lahiri
Films scored by Shankar–Ganesh
Indian dance films
Indian musical drama films
Tamil remakes of Hindi films